Amir Inayat Khan Shahani is a Pakistani politician who was a Member of the Provincial Assembly of the Punjab from May 2013 to May 2018 and from August 2018 to January 2023.

Early life and education
He was born on 1 December 1983 in Bhakkar.

He graduated in 2003 from University of the Punjab and has a degree of Bachelor of Arts.

Political career
He was elected to the Provincial Assembly of the Punjab as an independent candidate from Constituency PP-50 (Bhakkar-IV) in 2013 Pakistani general election. He joined Pakistan Muslim League (N) (PML-N) in May 2013.

In May 2018, he quit PML-N and joined Pakistan Tehreek-e-Insaf (PTI).

He was re-elected to Provincial Assembly of the Punjab as a candidate of PTI from Constituency PP-92 (Bhakkar-IV) in 2018 Pakistani general election.

References

Living people
Punjab MPAs 2013–2018
1983 births
Pakistan Muslim League (N) politicians
University of the Punjab alumni
People from Bhakkar District
Punjab MPAs 2018–2023
Pakistan Tehreek-e-Insaf MPAs (Punjab)